The discography of American record producer Metro Boomin consists of two studio albums, two mixtapes, one extended play, twelve singles, sixteen other charted songs and three collaborative albums. His debut mixtape, titled 19 & Boomin, was self-released on October 7, 2013. He released collaborative projects, such as Savage Mode (2016) with 21 Savage,  Perfect Timing (2017), with Nav, and Double or Nothing (2017) with Big Sean. On November 2, 2018, he released his debut solo studio album, Not All Heroes Wear Capes, becoming his first number one album in the United States, with a debut.

Studio albums

Collaborative albums

Mixtapes

Extended play

Singles

As lead artist

As featured artist

Other charted songs

Guest appearances

Notes

References 

Discographies of American artists
Hip hop discographies